Champagne is a sparkling wine from the Champagne region of France.

Champagne may also refer to:

Places

Regions 
 Champagne (province), an historic province in the Kingdom of France from 1314 to 1790
 Champagne wine region, a wine region in France notable for producing the sparkling wine
 Champagne-Ardenne, an administrative region of France from 1956 to 2015 (now part of Grand Est)
 County of Champagne, a medieval principality in France
 Grande Champagne, a cognac-producing region in France
 Petite Champagne, a cognac-producing region in France

Municipalities 
 Champagne, Ardèche, a municipality in France
 Champagne, Charente-Maritime, a municipality in France
 Champagne, Eure-et-Loir, a municipality in France
 Champagne, Switzerland, a municipality in the district of Jura-Nord Vaudois, in the canton of Vaud, in Switzerland
 Champagne-au-Mont-d'Or, a municipality in Francein the Rhône département, in France
 Champagne-en-Valromey, a municipality in the Ain département, in France
 Champagne-et-Fontaine, a municipality in the Dordogne département, in France
 Champagne-Mouton, a municipality in the Charente département, in France
 Champagne-sur-Loue, a municipality in the Jura département, in France
 Champagne-sur-Oise, a municipality in the Val-d'Oise département, in France
 Champagne-sur-Seine, a municipality in the Seine-et-Marne département, in France
 Champagne-sur-Vingeanne, a municipality in the Côte-d'Or département, in France
 Champagne-Vigny, a municipality in the Charente département, in France

Other places
 Champagne Castle, a mountain in South Africa
 Champagne and Aishihik First Nations, an indigenous group in Canada

Arts, entertainment, and media

Films
 Champagne (1928 film), a 1928 film by Alfred Hitchcock
 Champagne (2014 film), a film by Emem Isong, Starring Majid Michel and Alexx Ekubo

Music

Songs
 "Champagne" (Cavo song), 2009
 "Champagne" (Salt-n-Pepa song), 1996
 "Champagne", a song from the musical In the Heights
 "Champagne", a song from the film Tommy
 "Champagne", a song by Big Audio Dynamite from Tighten Up, Vol. 88
 "Champagne", a song by Peppino Di Capri, 1975
 "Champagne", a song by Kenny G from Duotones, 1986
 "Champagne", a song by Chris Rock from Roll with the New, 1997
 "Champagne", a song by Hervé Vilard, 1975
 "Champagne", a song by KSI and Randolph from the 2019 album New Age
 "Champagne, Champagne", a 2001 song by Vanessa Amorosi
 "Champagne?", a song by Joe Satriani from the album Engines of Creation, 2000

Other uses in music
 Champagne (album), a 2002 album by José Luis Rodríguez
 Champagne (band)
 Champagne (Miss Kittin & The Hacker EP), 1998
 Champagne, an EP by My Brightest Diamond

Battles
 First Battle of Champagne (December 1914 – March 1915)
 Second Battle of Champagne (September–October 1915)
 Third Battle of Champagne, better known as the Second Battle of the Aisne (April 1917)

Beverages
 Champagne soda, a type of carbonated beverage
 Sparkling wine, when used as a semi-generic term for wines made outside the Champagne region

People with the name
 Champagne (surname)
 Avishai Raviv, codename "Champagne", Israeli spy
 Evelyn "Champagne" King (born July 1, 1960), an American singer, songwriter, and record producer

Other uses
 Champagne (advertisement), a banned advertisement created by Microsoft to promote the Xbox in Europe
 Champagne (color)
 Champagne (grape), another name for the Italian wine grape Marzemina bianca
 Champagne Classic (BRC), a Brisbane Racing Club 2-year-old Thoroughbred horse race
 Champagne fairs, medieval trade fairs
 Champagne flute, a form of stemware designed specifically to enhance the drinking of champagne
 Champagne gene, a horse colour dilution gene

See also 
 Champagné (disambiguation)
 Champaign (disambiguation)
 Champange (disambiguation)
 "Shampain", a 2010 song by Marina and the Diamonds